Mohammad Imran Randhawa (born 25 December 1996) is a Pakistani cricketer. He made his first-class debut for Sui Northern Gas Pipelines Limited in the 2015–16 Quaid-e-Azam Trophy on 23 November 2015.

Early life
Before turning to professional cricket he initially trained as a Kabbadi player.

References

External links
 

1996 births
Living people
Pakistani cricketers
Bahawalpur cricketers
Faisalabad cricketers
Lahore Qalandars cricketers
Sui Northern Gas Pipelines Limited cricketers
People from Khanewal District
Peshawar Zalmi cricketers